Stórá is a river which runs through the village of Sørvágur in the Faroe Islands. The name Stórá translates to 'big river'.

The river runs through the heart of the village separating the village in two parts. In older times the river could get very wide when the rain poured down (hence the name). The Royal Engineers built a bridge over the river in 1942.

Rivers of the Faroe Islands